The Kilgore College Rangerettes, also known simply as the Rangerettes, are an American precision dance team from Kilgore College in Kilgore, Texas, created by Gussie Nell Davis in 1939. The Rangerettes have performed in 71 Cotton Bowl game halftimes in a row (1951-2021), and make regular appearances at NFL pre-game and half-time shows for the Dallas Cowboys and Houston Texans. The Rangerettes perform at Kilgore College football games, and in many other athletic and special events, including the Cotton Bowl game, the Macy's Thanksgiving Day Parade, and five presidential inaugurations. They have taken several world tours since the 1970s, including South America, the Far East, Romania, France, Canada, Japan, Italy, Switzerland, England, Scotland, and Ireland.

History
The Kilgore College Rangerettes were founded by Gussie Nell Davis, a physical education instructor from Farmersville, Texas who had previously taken an all-girl's group called the "Flaming Flashes" from being a simple high school pep-squad to an elaborately performing drum and bugle corps in Greenville, Texas. In 1939, Davis was hired away from Greenville High School by the Kilgore College Dean, Dr. B.E. Masters. Masters wanted something different than the traditional women's drum and bugle corps. He wanted something that would increase female enrollment at the college but would also keep fans in their seats during football half time shows instead of drinking alcohol under the stands. Opting early to forgo the use of musical instruments, Davis focused her new team on dance and choreography, later naming the group the Rangerettes. The Rangerettes became a success early on despite criticisms of their uniforms featuring skirts above the knee, which by the 1960s had become much shorter. Davis served as the group's director for forty years, until June 1979.

There is disagreement within the Rangerette alumni group and others in the dance team industry regarding the date of the first Rangerette performance. Several sources have it as September 12, 1940, but in an oral interview with Texas State University history professor Dan K. Utley, Davis confirmed the first performance date as September 19, 1940, as does the book, A History of Kilgore College, 1935-1981.

Directors
Gussie Nell Davis – 1940-1979
Deana Bolton Covin - 1979-1993
Dana Blair – 1993 to present

Performances and appearances
A partial list of major performances over the past 20 years
Nov 2022 - 96th Annual Macy's Thanksgiving Day Parade, New York City
Dec 2021 - 80th Anniversary Pearl Harbor Memorial Ceremony, Honolulu, Hawaii
Nov 2021 - 95th Annual Macy's Thanksgiving Day Parade, New York City
Jun 2021 - Virginia International Tattoo, Norfolk, Virginia
Nov 2019 - Birmingham Tattoo, Birmingham, England
Jul 2019 - Festival Bande, Modena, Italy
Nov 2018 - 92nd Annual Macy's Thanksgiving Day Parade, New York City
Jul 2018 - Basel Tattoo, Basel, Switzerland
Jan 2017 - Texas State Society Black Tie & Boots Ball, Washington, D.C., for the inauguration of Donald Trump
Dec 2016 - 75th Anniversary Pearl Harbor Memorial Ceremony, Honolulu, Hawaii
Nov 2016 - 90th Macy's Thanksgiving Day Parade, New York City
Mar 2015 - Saint Patrick's Day Parade, Dublin, Ireland 
Jan 2013 - Texas State Society Black Tie & Boots Ball, Washington, D.C. for the second inauguration of Barack Obama
Dec 2011 - 70th Anniversary Pearl Harbor Memorial Ceremony, Honolulu, Hawaii
Jan 2009 - Texas State Society Black Tie & Boots Ball, Washington, D.C. for the first inauguration of Barack Obama
Jan 2005 - Texas State Society Black Tie & Boots Ball, Washington, D.C. for the second inauguration of George W. Bush
Jan 2001 - Texas State Society Black Tie & Boots Ball, Washington, D.C. for the first inauguration of George W. Bush

Revels 
Revels is an annual variety show with a central theme performed at Dodson Auditorium on the Kilgore College campus. Revels features performances by Rangerettes with several dances choreographed by nationally known choreographers such as J.T. Horenstein  and Tracie Stanfield. There are five showings within the week of the program, and it is the last major performance of the year for the group. The revenue generated by the shows make it one of Kilgore College's highest grossing events. The last segment of the show is always an extended production kick routine, featuring all of the Rangerettes in the traditional uniform. Approximately 6,000 people see the show each year, with many people traveling from out of town to attend and provide a boost to Kilgore's economy.

Alumni
Rangerettes Forever is an alumni organization that participates in various support programs for the team.

In July 2005, the Zwick Foundation provided Kilgore College with a $3.5 million grant for design and construction of a new dormitory exclusively for use by the Rangerettes. The residence was completed in August 2006 for the 2006–2007 school year, and was formally dedicated in a ceremony a few months later. Kathryn Heller Zwick is a Rangerette from Longview, Texas, who attended Kilgore College and performed with the team from 1976 to 1978. Zwick's daughter, Lauren Gibler, was also a Rangerette from 2007 to 2009.

During the week of Revels 2019 (April 10–13), a donation of $1,000,000 was made to the Mike Miller Rangerette Fund to complete a permanent operating endowment for the Rangerettes. The anonymous donor was a Kilgore College graduate whose wife is a former Rangerette.

On Saturday, October 19, 2019, a former Kilgore College Rangerette and her husband donated a $3.5 million estate gift to fund scholarships for the Rangerette organization. The trust is set up to provide scholarships for Rangerettes and Rangerette Managers who meet the endowment's academic criteria.

Controversy and criticism
Until the 1970s there were no African American members of the team. According to the Texas State Historical Association, Davis said she would "be receptive when a qualified black tried out." The Rangerettes selected their first black team member, Freddie Goosby Evans, in 1973, and their first black officer, Briana McLaughlin, in 2012.

Some critics have "expressed dismay at the emphasis on physical attractiveness and rigorous and authoritarian training." Davis countered, "that there was nothing wrong in learning self-confidence, discipline, cooperation, and the ability to perform precision dance, along with poise, etiquette, and personal grooming".

Rangerette kidnapping
In the late afternoon of December 29, 2016, there was an armed home invasion and kidnapping at Rangerette Director Dana Blair's home. The assailant kidnapped Blair's daughter, who at the time was a Freshman Rangerette. Blair's daughter escaped her captor a little over an hour later. The assailant, Nancy Alice Motes, was arrested on a charge of aggravated kidnapping and released on $500,000 bond on December 30, 2016.

On June 22, 2017, Motes was indicted by a Gregg County Grand Jury, and faced first degree felonies in three charges encompassed in two counts for aggravated kidnapping. The first count included two charges: aggravated kidnapping with intent to terrorize and aggravated kidnapping with a deadly weapon. The second count had one count of aggravated kidnapping by deadly force.

On December 21, 2018, Blair's attorney filed a civil lawsuit against Motes seeking monetary relief of between $200,000 and $1 million.

On January 22, 2019, a start date of April 15, 2019, was set for the criminal trial against Motes.

On April 29, 2019, Motes pleaded guilty to two counts of aggravated kidnapping, one with a deadly weapon and one with deadly force. She was sentenced to two concurrent 5-year terms and had to serve at least half of her 5-year sentence before she was eligible for parole.

On July 1, 2021, Judge Alfonso Charles ordered Motes to pay Blair and her daughter $400,000 in compensatory damages and $175,000 in punitive damages.

Motes was granted parole in November 2021 after serving two and a half years of her five year sentence.

Popular culture
The Rangerettes have been featured in articles in several media publications, including: Life Magazine, Sports Illustrated, Newsweek, Esquire, Texas Monthly, The Saturday Evening Post, Popular Mechanics, and Texas Highways.

The Angelette Song from The Best Little Whorehouse in Texas features a drill team performance that parodies the Rangerettes

In the King of the Hill episode "The Company Man" (Season 2, Episode 9), Hank asks Peggy to wear a Kilgore Rangerette type outfit when they go out to dinner with Mr. Holloway, a man heavily influenced by Texan stereotypes.

In the February 14, 2020, comic strip Over the Hedge, the Rangerettes were mentioned as sending a Valentine's Day card to one of the characters.

In anticipation of the organization's 75th anniversary, filmmaker Chip Hale followed the Rangerettes for a year, creating the documentary Sweethearts of the Gridiron. In addition to Sweethearts of the Gridiron, the Rangerettes have appeared in four additional feature films: Seven Wonders of the World (1956), Beauty Knows No Pain (1971), Semi-Tough (1977), and Johnny Be Good (1988).

See also
Kilgore College
Drill Team
Dance Team

References

External links

Official Website

Performing groups established in 1940
Dance companies in the United States
University performing groups
Dance in Texas